Sir Richard Gorges-Meredyth, 1st Baronet (7 May 1735 – September 1821) was an Anglo-Irish politician and baronet.

Born Richard Gorges, son and heir of Hamilton Gorges, MP for Swords. On his marriage in 1775 to Mary, daughter and heir of Arthur Meredyth, he assumed the additional name of Meredyth before that of Gorges.

Gorges-Meredyth represented Enniskillen in the Irish House of Commons between 1768 and 1776.  In 1787 he was created a Baronet, of Catharines Grove in the Baronetage of Ireland. He sat in the Commons for Naas from 1787 to 1790.

He died without male issue, when his title became extinct. He was the grandfather of William Somerville, 1st Baron Athlumney.

References

1735 births
1821 deaths
18th-century Anglo-Irish people
Baronets in the Baronetage of Ireland
Irish MPs 1769–1776
Irish MPs 1783–1790
Members of the Parliament of Ireland (pre-1801) for County Fermanagh constituencies
Members of the Parliament of Ireland (pre-1801) for County Kildare constituencies
Richard